This article lists current political parties in Poland, as well as former parties dating back as far as 1918. Since 1989, Poland has had a multi-party system, with numerous competing political parties. Individual parties normally do not manage to gain power alone, and usually work with other parties to form coalition governments.

The transition from a mono-party Communist regime to liberal democracy and pluralism resulted in new political parties mushrooming in the early 1990s. After the first free parliamentary elections in 1991 seats in the Sejm were divided among more than a dozen different parties (amongst them such curiosities as the Polish Beer-Lovers' Party (Polska Partia Przyjaciół Piwa), led by a popular comedy actor, Janusz Rewiński). The existence of so many parties in the Sejm was seen by many as being counterproductive to the effectiveness of the parliament and a hindrance towards producing stable governments. Consequently, electoral reform was undertaken and an electoral threshold for the Lower House was instituted prior to the 1993 elections. The set threshold required a minimum vote of 5% for parties (with exemptions for ethnic minority parties) and 8% for electoral coalitions. The threshold was set at the national, rather than divisional, level, and had the effect of preventing many minor parties from winning seats in later elections. The threshold also prevented independent candidates from gaining election to the Sejm. Since 1990, the left side of the political scene has generally been dominated by former Communists turned social democrats. The right has largely comprised (former) Solidarity activists and supporters, but experienced deep divisions from the beginning, and showed less cohesiveness than the left. The right were unable to create a single bloc which could act as a lasting counterweight to the left-wing monolith, but instead, kept merging, splitting and renaming. Even so, the parties of the right did manage to win government again from 1997 to 2001 (having initially governed from 1989 to 1993).

Since the parliamentary elections of 2005, the right-wing parties have dominated the political scene, and appear to be in their strongest position to date. Two important developments in the political landscape have taken place since 2005. Firstly, the SLD (Communist successor) party is no longer the major, or one of the two major parties. Secondly, the main political battleground is no longer between the ex-Solidarity right versus the ex-Communist left. The new competing groupings are those of the Law and Justice party (promoting economic interventionism  and social conservatism) and the Civic Platform (representing a more liberal-conservative position). The general public disapproval of politics and politicians as a whole has resulted in almost all major parties excluding the very word "party" from their names, replacing it with words less associated with politics, such as "union", "platform", "league" or "alliance".

Parliamentary parties

Parties without representation

Far-left

Left-wing

Centre-left

Centre

Centre-right

Right-wing

Far-right

Minority interest parties

Parties difficult to define/regional

Historical parties

Important defunct parties after 1989

Defunct parties of People's Republic of Poland

Defunct and historical political parties in the Second Polish Republic, 1918–1939
 Agudath Israel
 Bloc of National Minorities – Blok Mniejszosci Narodowych
 General Jewish Labour Bund in Poland
 Camp of National Unity – Obóz Zjednoczenia Narodowego, OZN ("Ozon", continuation of BBWR, nationalist)
 Centrolew, "Center-Left" – coalition of parties.
 Chjeno-Piast – coalition of that included the Polish People's Party "Piast" and Christian Association of National Unity
 Christian Democracy – Labor Party – Chrześcijańska Demokracja (ChD)
 Communist Party of Poland – Komunistyczna Partia Polski, KPP – (communist, illegal)
 Folkspartei – Jewish People's Party ('Folkists')
 German Socialist Labour Party of Poland – (German: Deutsche Sozialistische Arbeitspartei Polens, abbreviated DSAP, Polish: Niemiecka Socjalistyczna Partia Pracy w Polsce)
 Labor Party – Stronnictwo Pracy, SP
 National Democracy – Narodowa Demokracja, ND ("Endecja") (nationalist)
 Popular National Union – Związek Ludowo-Narodowy, ZLN 
 National Party – Stronnictwo Narodowe, SN 
 National Radical Camp – Obóz Narodowo-Radykalny, ONR (extreme-right)
 National Radical Camp ABC
 National Radical Camp Falanga – Obóz Narodowo-Radykalny Falanga or Falanga
 National Workers' Party – Narodowa Partia Robotnicza, NPR 
 Nonpartisan Bloc for Cooperation with the Government – Bezpartyjny Blok Współpracy z Rządem, BBWR (organization of Sanacja)
 Peasant Party – Stronnictwo Chłopskie, SCh
 People's Party – Stronnictwo Ludowe, SL
 Polish People's Party PSL – Polish People's Party (agrarians)
 Polish People's Party "Piast"
 Polish People's Party "Wyzwolenie"
 Polish Socialist Party – Polska Partia Socjalistyczna, PPS (socialist)
 Polish Socialist Party – Revolutionary Faction – Polska Partia Socjalistyczna – Frakcja Rewolucyjna
 Polish Socialist Party – Left – Polska Partia Socjalistyczna – Lewica
 Sanation – Sanacja (meant to "restore health" to the body politic: authoritarian, centrist)
 Ukrainian National Democratic Alliance – (UNDO) (Ukrainian: Українське національно-демократичне об'єднання, УНДО, Ukrayin'ske Natsional'no-Demokratichne Obyednannia, Polish: Ukraińskie Zjednoczenie Narodowo-Demokratyczne)
 Związek Chłopski ZCh (Polish Wikipedia article)

Defunct and historical parties Political parties before 1918
 Polish Social Democratic Party – Polska Partia Socjaldemokratyczna (1890-1919)
 Polish Socialist Party – Polska Partia Socjalistyczna (1892-1948)
 Social Democracy of the Kingdom of Poland and Lithuania – Socjaldemokracja Krolestwa Polskiego i Litwy (1893-1918)
 Polish Socialist Party of the Prussian Partition – Polska Partia Socjalistyczna Zaboru Pruskiego (1893-1919)
 Polish Socialist Party – Revolutionary Faction – Polska Partia Socjalistyczna - Frakcja Rewolucyjna (1893-1918)
 National-Democratic Party – Stronnictwo Narodowo-Demokratyczne (1897-1919)
 National Workers' Union – Narodowy Związek Robotników (1905-1920)
 Polish Socialist Party – Left – Polska Partia Socjalistyczna - Lewica (1906-1918)
 Christian Democratic Party – Stronnictwo Chrześcijańskiej Demokracji (1919-1937)
 Polish Socialist-Democratic Party of Galicia and Cieszyn Silesia – Polska Partia Socjalno-Demokratyczna Galicji i Śląska Cieszyńskiego
 Progressive-Democratic Union – Związek Postępowo-Demokratyczny
 Real Politics Party – Stronnictwo Polityki Realnej
 Polish People's Party – Polskie Stronnictwo Ludowe 
 National Workers' Faction – Narodowe Stronnictwo Robotników
 Peasantry Union – Związek Stronnictwa Chłopskiego
 Popular Christian Party – Stronnictwo Chrześcijańsko-Ludowe
 Polish Popular Centre – Polskie Centrum Ludowe

Polish Lithuanian Commonwealth
Patriotic Party
Hetmans' Party
Familia party

See also
 Politics of Poland
 List of political parties by country
 List of politicians in Poland

References

Further reading 
 Dariusz Cecuda, Leksykon Opozycji Politycznej 1976-1989, BIS Trust, Warszawa 1989
 Małgorzata Dehnel-Szyc, Jadwiga Stachura, Gry polityczne. Orientacje na dziś, Oficyna Wydawnicza Volument, Warszawa 1991
 Piotr Frączak (e.d), Gorączka czasu przełomu. Dokumenty ugrupowań radykalnych 1989-1990, Instytut Studiów Politycznych Polskiej Akademii Nauk, Wydawnictwo Adam Marszałek, Warszawa 1984
 Inka Słodkowska (ed.), Programy partii i ugrupowań  1989-1991' vol. 1–2, Instytut Studiów Politycznych Polskiej Akademii Nauk, Warszawa 1995

Poland
 
Political parties
Poland
Political parties